The geographic center of the United States is a point approximately  north of Belle Fourche, South Dakota at .  It has been regarded as such by the U.S. National Geodetic Survey (NGS) since the additions of Alaska and Hawaii to the United States in 1959.

Overview

This is distinct from the contiguous geographic center, which has not changed since the 1912 admissions of New Mexico and Arizona to the 48 contiguous United States, and falls near the town of Lebanon, Kansas.

According to the NGS data sheet, the actual marker is "set in an irregular mass of concrete 36 inches below the surface of the ground."

For public commemoration, a nearby proxy marker is located in a park in Belle Fourche, where one will find a flag atop a small concrete slab bearing a U.S. Coast and Geodetic Survey Reference Marker.

Contiguous United States

Overview

While any measurement of the exact center of a land mass will always be imprecise due to changing shorelines and other factors, the NGS coordinates are recognized in a historical marker in a small park at the intersection of AA Road and K-191. It is accessible by a turn-off from U.S. Route 281.

It is distinct from the geographic center of the 50 United States located at a point northeast of Belle Fourche, South Dakota, reflecting the 1959 additions of the states of Alaska and Hawaii.

Marker

In order to protect the privacy of the private land owner where the point identified by the 1918 survey falls, a proxy marker was erected in 1940 about half a mile away.

Its inscription reads:

The GEOGRAPHIC CENTER of the UNITED STATES
LAT. 39°50' LONG. −98°35'
NE 1/4 – SE 1/4 – S32 – T2S – R11W
Located by L.T. Hagadorn of Paulette & Wilson – Engineers and L.A. Beardslee – County Engineer. From data furnished by U.S. Coast and Geodetic Survey. 
Sponsored by Lebanon Hub Club. Lebanon, Kansas. April 25, 1940

An American flag usually flies atop a pole placed on the monument. A covered picnic area and the U.S. Center Chapel, a small eight-pew chapel, are nearby.

Method of measurement
In 1918, the Coast and Geodetic Survey found this location by balancing on a point a cardboard cutout shaped like the U.S. This method was accurate to within 20 miles, but while the Geodetic Survey no longer endorses any location as the center of the U.S., the identification of Lebanon, Kansas, has remained.

Cultural references

The geographic center of the contiguous United States is mentioned in Neil Gaiman's American Gods as a neutral ground where the modern and the old gods can meet despite the war between them.

In the 1969 Disney movie The Computer Wore Tennis Shoes, the final question of the college knowledge program is, "A small Midwest city is located exactly on an area designated as the 'geographic center of the United States.' For ten points and $100,000, can you tell us the name of that city?" The answer of Lebanon, Kansas is accepted as correct.

A 2021 Jeep Super Bowl commercial titled "The Middle", starring Bruce Springsteen, features the U.S. Center Chapel in Lebanon, Kansas.

North of Belle Fourche, South Dakota is referenced as the geographic center of the U.S. in "A Serpent's Tooth: A Longmire Mystery Book 9" by Craig Johnson.

See also 
 Geographic centers of the United States
 Mean center of the United States population
 Median center of United States population
 Center of population
 United States Geological Survey (USGS)

References

External links
 
 In the Middle of Nowhere, a Nation’s Center, New York Times
 Smith County Map, KDOT
 Kansas Travel article
 Center for Land Use Interpretation article about the origins and accuracy of the marker
 Roadside America article
 USGS information
 The Center of the United States article about applying mathematical methods to geography

Geography of the United States
United States
Historic surveying landmarks in the United States